The Necktie is a 2008 animated short by Jean-François Lévesque about a man with a dreary job who rediscovers his old accordion at age 40, and with it, his joy for life.

The film uses a variety of animation techniques. The central character is a puppet filmed in stop-motion, inside miniature sets. His co-workers are animated with traditional animation drawings on paper, digitally integrated into shots but designed to give the appearance of being 2D cardboard cutouts. The Necktie was produced in Montreal by the National Film Board of Canada.

The film garnered the Jutra Award for Best Animated Short Film, the Fabrizio Bellochio Prize for Social Content at the I Castelli Animati Festival, the youth jury prize for best animated short at the Festival de cinéma des 3 Amériques as well as the Best Short Film Award and the Audience Prize for Best Canadian Short Film at the Montreal World Film Festival.

References

External links
Watch The Necktie at NFB.ca
 The Necktie: an interview with Jean-François Lévesque

2008 films
Animated films without speech
Stop-motion animated short films
Quebec films
National Film Board of Canada animated short films
2000s animated short films
2008 animated films
2000s Canadian films
Best Animated Short Film Jutra and Iris Award winners